39th Street is a major west/east main street that runs in Kansas City, Missouri from State Line Road to Topping Avenue.  It was originally named Rosedale Avenue as it led to the town of Rosedale.  It connects Westport and Kansas City, Kansas. The University of Kansas Hospital is at the starting point and the ending point is in the Leeds Industrial District.

West 39th Street
Also referred to as W39thKC. This half mile corridor serves as a commercial connector of local shops and businesses located along 39th Street from State Line Road to Southwest Trafficway.

West 39th Street attractions are monthly 3rd Friday events, Roselawn, Thomas Hart Benton Home & Studio Museum, Roanoke Park, and the Westport-Roanoke Community Center.

39th Street serves as the main artery of the Volker Neighborhood, as well as the southern boundary of the Roanoke Neighborhood.

See also

 Linwood Boulevard (Kansas City)
 Prospect Avenue (Kansas City, Missouri)
 Southwest Boulevard (Kansas City)
 The Paseo (Kansas City)

References

Further reading

External links
 Volker Neighborhood Association
 Roanoke Protective Homes Association
 39th Street Community Improvement District (Business association)
 39th Street ArtWalk

Streets in Kansas City, Missouri
Transportation in Kansas City, Missouri